Stephen Davies (born 31 January 1965) is a former international speedway rider from Australia.

Speedway career 
Davies twice won medals at the Australian National Championships. He won a silver medal in 1989 behind Glenn Doyle and a bronze medal the following year in 1990. He was the champion of New South Wales on several occasions and reached the 1987 Individual Long Track World Championship semi final.

Davies rode in the top tier of British Speedway from 1986 to 1992, riding for King's Lynn Stars and Peterborough Panthers. He captained the triple winning Peterborough side during the 1992 British League Division Two season.

Personal life
His son Alex Davies, born in Northampton, was a profssional rider in the UK from 2020 to 2016.

References 

1965 births
Living people
Australian speedway riders
King's Lynn Stars riders
Peterborough Panthers riders